Billy Mitchell Janniro (born 30 July 1980 in Benicia, California, United States) is a former motorcycle speedway rider from the United States.

Career
Billy "The Kid" Janniro rode for the Coventry Bees and Peterborough Panthers in the British Leagues, and also represented the USA in the 2001 Speedway World Cup Final at the Olympic Stadium in Wrocław, Poland.

He is a ten-time winner of the AMA National Speedway Championship, having won the title in 2008, 2010, 2011, 2013, 2014, 2015, 2016, 2017, 2018 and 2019 and a six times USA Champion. He is also a five-time winner of the California State Championship 2010, 2011, 2012, 2014, 2017 and winner - Longtrack Championship in 2009.

Janniro won the Elite League with Coventry in 2005 and 2007, the Elite League Knockout Cup in 2006 and 2007 with the Bees and the Craven Shield in 2007 and 2008.

World Final Appearances

Speedway World Cup
 2001 -  Wrocław, Olympic Stadium - 5th - 30pts (1)

References

1980 births
Living people
American speedway riders
Coventry Bees riders
Peterborough Panthers riders
People from Benicia, California